HMS Russell was an 80-gun third rate ship of the line of the Royal Navy, launched at Portsmouth Dockyard on 3 June 1692.

She was rebuilt according to the 1706 Establishment at Rotherhithe, and was relaunched on 16 March 1709. Instead of mounting her 80 guns on two decks, as she had done as originally built, she now mounted them on three decks, but remained classified as a third rate. On 4 February 1729 she was ordered to be taken to pieces and rebuilt to the 1719 Establishment at Deptford, from where she was relaunched on 8 September 1735.

Russell was sunk as a breakwater in 1762.

Notes

References

Lavery, Brian (2003) The Ship of the Line - Volume 1: The development of the battlefleet 1650-1850. Conway Maritime Press. .

Ships of the line of the Royal Navy
1690s ships
Ships built in Deptford
Ships built in Rotherhithe
Ships built in Portsmouth